Pukhavichy District (Pukhavichsky Rajon) is a second-level administrative subdivision (raion) of Belarus in the east of Minsk Voblast. The capital of the town is Marjina Horka.

Geography
Main settlements
Marjina Horka (22,500)
Svislač (4,053)
Rudziensk (2,900)
Praŭdzinski (2,900)
Šack
Družny
Puchavičy

Notable residents 

 Michaś Čarot (1896, Rudziensk - 1937), Belarusian poet, playwright, novelist, and a victim of Stalin's purges

 Aliaksandr Čarviakoŭ (1892, Dukorki village - 1937), Belarusian politician and publicist

 Hienadź Klaŭko (1931, Varoničy village – 1979), Belarusian poet and translator

Vykankam Chairpersons
The following people held the post at various times.
Siarhei Turko (Сергей Андреевич Турко)
Fyodor Karalyenya (Федор Петрович Караленя)

References

External links

Selsoviets
Maryina Gorka, an independent portal
Svislac: regional Portal (Newsline of Pukhavichy district)

 
Districts of Minsk Region